Gro Skartveit (born 24 August 1965) is a Norwegian politician for the Liberal Party.

She was originally a member of the Christian Democratic Party, but left in 2001 after she came out as a lesbian.

She served as a deputy representative to the Norwegian Parliament from Rogaland during the term 2005–2009. On the local level she has been a member of Stavanger city council, and is a member of Rogaland county council. She is also a member of the board of the Western Norway Regional Health Authority.

She hails from Finnøy.

References

External links

1965 births
Living people
Christian Democratic Party (Norway) politicians
Liberal Party (Norway) politicians
Deputy members of the Storting
Politicians from Stavanger
Lesbian politicians
Norwegian LGBT politicians
21st-century Norwegian women politicians
21st-century Norwegian politicians
Women members of the Storting